Braat is a Dutch-language surname. People with the name include:

 Arend Braat, Dutch politician, Peasants' League member of parliament
 Floris Braat (born 1979), Dutch canoeist
 Joseph Braat (born 1946), Dutch optical engineer
 Marloes Braat (born 1990), Dutch cricketer
 Sebastiaan Braat (born 1992), Dutch cricketer

Dutch-language surnames